Fairly is a surname. Notable people with the name include:

Caleb Fairly (born 1987), American road racing cyclist
Ron Fairly (1938–2019), American baseball player and broadcaster

See also
Fairley, surname
Fairlie (surname)